Fabio Renato Rojas Prieto (born 4 August 1999) is a Peruvian footballer who plays as a centre back or right back for Peruvian Primera División side Alianza Lima.

Club career

Alianza Lima
Rojas started playing football at the age of five and later joined Alianza Lima from Academia Deportiva Cantolao in 2011.

He was promoted to the first on 30 March 2017 and on 9 April 2017, 17-year old Rojas got his official debut as a starter for Alianza against Juan Aurich. He played a total of three games in the 2017 season. In the following season, Rojas made no appearances for the first team but was a regular starter of the club's reserve team. To gain some experience, he was loaned out to UTC Cajamarca for the 2019 season.

Despite a successful loan spell at UTC with 19 appearances in the Peruvian Primera División, he was loaned out to Ayacucho FC for the 2020 season.

International career
In 2014, Rojas was a part of the Peruvian U15 national team, who won gold in the 2014 Summer Youth Olympics in Nanjing and in 2017, he was also a part of the U18 national team.

Rojas was called up for the Peruvian U20 national team in January 2019 who was going to play in the 2019 South American U-20 Championship. Rojas was also the captain of the U20 team.

Personal life
Rojas' uncle is the former Deportivo de La Coruña forward William Huapaya.

References

External links
 
 

Living people
1999 births
Association football defenders
Peruvian footballers
Peruvian Primera División players
Club Alianza Lima footballers
Universidad Técnica de Cajamarca footballers
Ayacucho FC footballers